USS Rose was a screw steamer acquired by the Union Navy during the American Civil War.

She was used by the Union Navy as a tugboat and ammunition ship in support of the Union Navy blockade of Confederate waterways.

Commissioned in New York City as a tugboat in 1864 

The wooden screw steamer Ai Fitch was purchased by the Navy on 12 December 1863 from Laurence Fitch, New York City; fitted out for service as a tug; and commissioned on 8 February 1864.

Civil War service

Supporting McClellan’s Peninsula Campaign 

Ordered to New Orleans, Louisiana, to join the West Gulf Blockading Squadron, she departed New York City soon after commissioning and proceeded to Hampton Roads, Virginia, where she was detained to support Major General Benjamin Butler's Army of the James up the James River at the beginning of the Bermuda Hundred Campaign on 4 May.

On 5 May she got underway to tow the monitor  up the James River to support Union Army forces converging on Petersburg, Virginia. Remaining on the river well into June, she performed towing duties, tender services, and carried ammunition and powder up from City Point, Virginia. On the 24th she returned to Hampton Roads and prepared to resume her cruise to the Gulf of Mexico.

Reassigned to the Gulf of Mexico 

Rose departed Hampton Roads on 26 July and arrived in Mississippi Sound on 5 August. After receiving a second gun, a heavy 12-pounder, she proceeded to Mobile Bay where she remained into September.

She then shifted back to Mississippi Sound where she added patrol duty to her other duties. In December she captured a small vessel laden with turpentine.

In late February 1865, Rose steamed to New Orleans, Louisiana; repaired; and in mid-April returned to Mobile, Alabama, to assist in clearing channels in the bay. During April, she struck a Confederate mine in Mobile Bay and sank with the loss of two men killed and three wounded, but she was refloated and repaired and returned to service. She remained in the Mobile area performing tug service into the fall, then shifted to Pensacola, Florida, where, being retained for service after the Civil War, she was assigned to the Pensacola Navy Yard.

Post-war decommissioning and sale 
Rose was struck from the Navy list on 3 March 1883 and sold on 20 September 1883.

See also 

Union Blockade

References 

Ships of the Union Navy
Steamships of the United States Navy
Tugs of the United States Navy
Ammunition ships of the United States Navy
American Civil War auxiliary ships of the United States
1863 ships
Shipwrecks of the American Civil War
Shipwrecks of the Alabama coast
Ships sunk by mines
Maritime incidents in April 1865